Mens sana in corpore sano is a Latin phrase, usually translated as "a healthy mind in a healthy body". The phrase is widely used in sporting and educational contexts to express that physical exercise is an important or essential part of mental and psychological well-being.

History

The phrase comes from Satire X of the Roman poet Juvenal (10.356). It is the first in a list of what is desirable in life:

Traditional commentators believe that Juvenal's intention was to teach his fellow Roman citizens that in the main, their prayers for such things as long life are misguided. That the gods had provided man with virtues which he then lists for them.

Over time and separated from its context, the phrase has come to have a range of meanings.  It can be construed to mean that only a healthy mind can lead to a healthy body, or equally that only a healthy body can produce or sustain a healthy mind.  Its most general usage is to express the hierarchy of needs: with physical and mental health at the root.

An earlier, similar saying is attributed to the pre-Socratic philosopher Thales:

Usages

Later usages
 John Locke (1632–1704) uses the phrase in his book Some Thoughts Concerning Education, 1693.
 Heinrich von Treitschke used this phrase in his work titled The Army.  He uses the phrase to highlight a sound principle of his German nationalistic doctrine.  His work echoes the principles of late nineteenth century Prussian society.
 Its first use in an athletic context appears to have been by John Hulley in December 1861. In 1862 he chose it as the motto of the Liverpool Athletic Club and Liverpool Olympic Games.
 , leader of the Public Health Council of the Netherlands during the Second World War, used the phrase as goal for public health care.
 Usage as the motto of athletic clubs:
 Liverpool Athletic Club
 Gimnasia y Esgrima de Buenos Aires
 Club de Gimnasia y Esgrima La Plata
 Georgetown Hoyas
 R.S.C. Anderlecht
 The Turners Organization American Turners and their local organizations like the Los Angeles turners.
 Carlton Football Club
 Asociacion Atletica Argentinos Juniors
 The Israeli Institute of Technology athletics teams
 Mens Sana Basket
 Beale Gaelic Football Club from County Kerry
 Torrens Rowing Club
 Sydney Rowing Club
 Usage as the motto of military institutions:
 Royal Marines physical training instructors (PTI).
 Riverside Military Academy in Gainesville, Georgia
 Hargrave Military Academy in Chatham, Virginia
 Army Physical Training Corps (APTC)
 PERI (Physical Education & Recreation Instructors), which is part of the Canadian Military
 New Zealand Defence Force Physical Training Instructors.
 Usage as the motto of educational institutions:
East Brisbane State School, Queensland, Australia
Windham High School (Ohio)
Hiranandani Foundation School, Mumbai, India
 Teacher's College of Columbia University has this phrase engraved on its Horace Mann hall, on 120th Street in New York City
 The University College London Men's Rugby Football Club, Based out of the Bloomsbury in London
 Grant Medical College and Sir J.J. Hospital, Mumbai
 Widener University and the State University of New York at Buffalo
 The phrase appears in stone on the western facade of the School of Public Health at Indiana University in Bloomington, Indiana
 The phrase appears in stone above the entranceway to the Athletic Center at Mount Allison University in Sackville, New Brunswick
 Albert Schweitzer Pastoral Medicine Institute
 Dhaka Physical Education College in Dhaka, Bangladesh
 Sparta High School in Sparta, New Jersey
 Charleston Female Seminary
 Detroit Country Day School in Beverly Hills, Michigan
 Erskine Academy in South China, Maine
 Roger Bacon High School, St. Bernard, Ohio
 Bjelke-Petersen School of Physical Culture, Australia
 Bridgewater Junior Senior High School in Bridgewater, Nova Scotia
 Kongsbakken videregående skole in Tromsø, Norway
Lakefield College School in Lakefield, Canada
 Polish Association of Sport named SOKÓŁ before World War I. Poland, Galicja in that time Austria
 The Internado Nacional Barros Arana in Santiago, Chile.
 Used as a line in the school song of Bangor Grammar School, in Bangor, County Down, Northern Ireland.
 Used as motto for Lundsbergs skola, an elite school in Sweden.
 Used as motto for Foxcroft School, an all-girls' boarding school in Middleburg, Virginia.
 Westholme School, an independent school set on the edge of the countryside of Blackburn, England
 Loyola High School in Montreal, Quebec, Canada
 Winsor School in Boston, Massachusetts uses the English translation as their motto.
 Usage in other cases:
 The phrase was a favorite of Harry S. Truman, the 33rd President of the United States.
 The sneaker and sports equipment manufacturer Asics takes its name from an acronym of a variant: "anima sana in corpore sano" 'a healthy soul in a healthy body'.
 Mensa, a high-IQ society, derives its name both from the Latin word for table, "mensa" as well as a pun on the phrase "mens sana".
 Sound Body Sound Mind, a United States nonprofit organization (501(c)(3) that promotes self-confidence and healthy lifestyle choices among children.
 A variant, in Danish En sund sjæl i et sundt legeme was the motto of Captain J.P. Jespersen, a Danish gymnastics educator/instructor.
 Nikola Tesla, in his work titled "The Problem of Increasing Human Energy" supports the idea, recommending moderate exercise and avoiding overemphasis on physical fitness. 
 "In corpore sano" is a song by the Serbian singer-songwriter Konstrakta which she represented Serbia in the Eurovision Song Contest 2022 with, finishing 5th.
 Victoria Wood uses it in comedic parody Mens Sana In Thingummy Doodah

See also
Mind-body dualism

Footnotes

References
 
  Mens Sana in Corpore Sano? Body and Mind in Ancient Greece" by David C. Young. The International Journal of the History of Sport, Vol.22, No.1, (January 2005), pp.22–41

Latin words and phrases